Notable people from Moravia include:

A 
Karel Abraham (1990–), motorcycle racer

B 
Tomáš Baťa (1876–1932), entrepreneur, founder of Bata Shoes company
Thomas J. Bata (1914–2008), entrepreneur, son of Tomáš Baťa and former head of the Bata shoe company
Otakar Borůvka (1899–1995), mathematician, publisher of Borůvka's algorithm
Zdeněk Burian (1905–1981), painter, book illustrator, paleontology reconstructor

D 
Miroslav Donutil (1951–), actor

E 
Heinrich Wilhelm Ernst (1814–1865), violinist

F 
Emil Filla (1882–1930), painter
Rudolf Firkušný (1912–1994), pianist
Sigmund Freud (1856–1939), father of psychoanalysis
Bohuslav Fuchs (1895–1972), modernist architect

G 
Kurt Gödel (1906–1978), theoretical mathematician

H 
Hugo Haas (1901–1968), film actor, director and writer
Anton Hanak (1875–1934), sculptor
Stefan von Haschenperg, (floruit 1540s), military engineer in England
Dagmar Havlová (1953–), actress and former First Lady of the Czech Republic (1997–2003)
Josef Hoffmann (1870–1956), architect
Bohumil Hrabal (1914–1997), writer
Edmund Husserl (1859–1938), philosopher

I 
Markéta Irglová (1988–), songwriter, musician, singer

J 
Leoš Janáček (1854–1928), composer
Maria Jeritza (1887–1982), soprano
Jobst of Moravia (Jodok of Luxemburg) (1351–1411), King of the Romans (antiking), margrave of Moravia

K 
Georg Joseph Kamel (1661–1701), botanist, Jesuit missionary
Jan Keller (1955–), sociologist
Antonín Kohout (1919–2013), cellist, member of the Smetana Quartet
Luboš Kohoutek (1935–), astronomer
John Amos Comenius (1592–1670), educator and theologian
Erich Wolfgang Korngold (1897–1957), film music composer
Leon Koudelak (1961–), guitarist
Magdalena Kožená (1973–), mezzo-soprano
Karel Kryl (1944–1994), popular musician and songwriter, critic of the communism in Czechoslovakia
Ernst Křenek (1900–1991), composer
Otakar Kubín (1883–1969), avant-garde painter
Milan Kundera (1929–), writer

L 
Ivan Lendl (1960–), tennis player
Adolf Loos (1870–1933), architect, author of essay Ornament and Crime

M 
Ernst Mach (1838–1916), physicist and philosopher
Tomáš Garrigue Masaryk (1850–1937), philosopher and politician, first president of Czechoslovakia
Christian Mayer (1719–1783), astronomer
Jan Milíč z Kroměříže, religious reformer
Mojmir I of Moravia, first known ruler
Mojmir II of Moravia, last known ruler
Alfons Mucha (1860–1939), painter
Vladimír Menšík (1929–1988), popular actor and entertainer

P 
František Palacký (1798–1876), historian and politician
Franz Petrasch (1744–1820) general officer in the Habsburg military
Anton Pilgram (1450–1516), architect, sculptor and woodcarver
George Placzek (1905–1955), physicist, participant in Manhattan Project
Bolek Polívka (1949–), actor, mime, playwright and screenwriter
Georg Prochaska (1749–1820), ophthalmologist and physiologist

R 
King Rastislav of Moravia
Karl Renner (1870–1950), politician, co-founder of Friends of Nature movement

S 
Emilie Schindler (1907–2001), Sudeten German humanitarian, wife of Oskar Schindler
Oskar Schindler (1908–1974), Sudeten German entrepreneur, known for saving the lives of almost 1,200 Jews during WWII
Joseph Schumpeter (1883–1950), economist and political scientist
Peter Sís (1949–), illustrator, animator and writer
Jan Skácel (1922–1989), poet
Duke Slavomir of Moravia, leader of Moravia around 871
Leo Slezak (1873–1946), operatic tenor
John Sobieslaw of Moravia (1352–1394), Patriarch of Aquileia
Františka Stránecká (1839–1888), writer and folklore collector
Tom Stoppard (1937–), British playwright
King Svatopluk I of Moravia (c. 840–894), ruler of Great Moravia
Svatopluk II (c. 884–906), Moravian prince of Nitra
Ludvík Svoboda (1895–1979), General of I Czechoslovak Army Corps, seventh president of Czechoslovakia
Jan Syrový (1888–1970), general, politician

T 
Anna Ticho (1894–1980), Israeli artist
Miroslav Tichý (1926–2011), photographer
Pavel Tichý (1936–1994), logician, philosopher
František Tomášek (1899–1992), Archbishop of Prague
Ivana Trump (1949–2022), fashion model, TV presenter
Ernst Tugendhat (1930–), German philosopher

V 
Pavel Vranický (1756–1808), classical composer

W 
Jan Eskymo Welzl (1868–1948), globetrotter and gold-digger, chief of the Siberian Yupik peoples
Otto Wichterle (1913–1998), chemist, inventor of contact lenses
Zdeňka Wiedermannová-Motyčkova (1868–1915), women's education and women's rights activist

Z 
Emil Zátopek (1922–2000), long-distance runner, 4 times Olympic winner

People by region in the Czech Republic
Moravians
People from Moravia